Neolissochilus soroides, commonly called the soro brook carp or antimony fish, is a freshwater fish of Thailand, Malaysia and Indonesia.

Due to very confusing morphological similarities with the related species Neolissochilus hendersoni, further work is needed to correctly identify between these species. There may even be a case for describing some of these morphs as distinct, new species.

Known as 'tengas' in Bahasa Malayu Malay language.

Dispersion 
The southern basins

References

External links 

http://www.fishbase.org/summary/27086

Fish of Thailand
Cyprinid fish of Asia
Fish described in 1904